Streak plate may refer to:

 In streaking (microbiology), the plate used to incubate a culture and isolate a pure strain
 In streak (mineralogy), the plate used to produce the powder of a mineral